José Solano (born February 22, 1971) is an American actor.

Solano is best known for his role as Manny Gutierrez on Baywatch, and being the first Hispanic series regular on that show. He was named one of the "50 Most Beautiful People in the World" by YM magazine after winning their "Man of the Year" contest. Nominated for an "Outstanding Individual Performance in a Nationally Syndicated Drama Series" ALMA Award, he later received the Nosotros Margo Albert Golden Eagle Award for Most Promising Actor of 1997, presented to him by Ricardo Montalbán.

External links
 
 Interview - "Surf's Up For 'Baywatch's' Jose Solano"
 Jose Solano bio at Baywatch Database
 Jose Solano bio at Mi Escuelita Preschool site
 Short bio and pictures

1971 births
Living people
American male film actors
American male television actors
20th-century American male actors
Hispanic and Latino American male actors
Male actors from Inglewood, California
Male actors from California